The Noongar (alternatively spelled as Nungar) of sisodia rajput clan are a Hindu caste found in the states of Haryana and Punjab.

Origin 

Noongars were earlier involved in the salt trade. Nowadays most of them have abandoned their traditional trade and are now involved in financial and information technology sectors. They consider themselves Rajput from the Suryavanshi clan.

Current situation
Most of them are concentrated around Punjab and Haryana mainly Patiala, Ambala,Faridabad, Panchkula,Banud Rajpura,Zirakpur and Delhi districts.

References 

Social groups of Haryana
Social groups of Punjab, India
Punjabi tribes
Sikh communities
Indian castes
Saltmaking castes